State Route 158 (SR 158) is a primary state highway in the U.S. state of Virginia. Known for most of its length as Front Street, the state highway runs  from U.S. Route 58 Alternate (US 58 Alternate) in Coeburn east to US 58 Alternate east of Coeburn. SR 158 comprises much of the old alignment of US 58 Alternate through Coeburn in eastern Wise County.

Route description

SR 158 begins at a right-in/right-out interchange with westbound US 58 Alternate (Norton Coeburn Road) in the town of Coeburn. The state highway heads east as Front Street to its intersection with SR 72 (Laurel Avenue) and SR 813 (2nd Street); the latter street connects SR 158 and eastbound US 58 Alternate. SR 158 and SR 72 run concurrently through a grade crossing of a rail spur from Norfolk Southern Railway's Clinch Valley District and enter downtown Coeburn. East of downtown, SR 72 turns south onto Dungannon Road. SR 158 parallels the Clinch Valley rail line east to the east town limit of Coeburn, where the highway becomes Bull Run Road. At SR 893 (Bull Run Road), SR 158 turns south, crosses the rail line, and reaches its eastern terminus at an intersection with US 58 Alternate (Bull Run Road).

Major intersections

References

External links

Virginia Highways Project: VA 158

158
State Route 158
U.S. Route 58